Jarovce is a small borough of Bratislava, Slovakia.

History 
The village was first mentioned in 1208 under the name Ban. During the Ottoman wars, many Croats settled here in the 16th century (therefore "Croatian" in the German name to bordering Deutsch Jahrndorf / "German" Jahrndorf in Austria). They are still a strong minority. The area belonged to Hungary until 1947 along with the neighbouring villages Rusovce (Oroszvár in Hungarian) and Čunovo (Dunacsún in Hungarian). In the years 1947-1950, Jarovce administratively belonged to Rusovce. It has been an official borough of Bratislava since 1 January 1972.

Transport 
Jarovce is where the only motorway (European route E58) border crossing between Slovakia and Austria is located. The Austrian crossing is called Kittsee. There is a smaller crossing near the Kittsee railway station. Border checks at both crossings were discontinued on 21 December 2007 after Slovakia joined the Schengen Area.

The St. Nicholas church in Jarovce 
The oldest church in locality of Bratislava V is the late baroque St. Nicholas church which is located in Jarovce, which comes from the years 1763-1765. There are two versions of its establishment. The first version holds it that the church was built by local inhabitants in 1765. The second version says that this church was built by an owner of this location - by the count Miklós Eszterházy. Before the end of World War II on 3 April 1945, the church tower was destroyed by the recessive German armies. Building-up the new church tower lasted two years. People put into this tower two carillons which are there up to this day. The last repairs were made in the end of the 1990s.

Demographics
According to the 2011 census, the municipality had 1,438 inhabitants. 1,044 of inhabitants were Slovaks, 220 Croats, 122 Hungarians and 52 others and unspecified.

References

External links 
 jarovcemu.sk 

Boroughs of Bratislava
Austria–Slovakia border crossings
Croatian communities in Slovakia
Villages in Slovakia merged with towns